"Breaking Bad" is the eleventh episode of the sixth season of Better Call Saul, the spin-off television series of Breaking Bad. It was written and directed by Thomas Schnauz. The episode aired on AMC and AMC+ on August 1, 2022, before debuting online in certain territories on Netflix the following day. "Breaking Bad" depicts the life of Jimmy McGill, both during his time as lawyer "Saul Goodman" in Albuquerque, New Mexico; and after changing his identity to Gene Takavic and relocating to Omaha, Nebraska.

The episode was met with positive reviews. An estimated 1.34 million viewers saw the episode during its first broadcast on AMC.

Plot 
In a flashback to Albuquerque in 2008, Jimmy McGill, going by the name Saul Goodman, has been kidnapped by Walter White and Jesse Pinkman and is being transported in the back of their RV. After Saul recognizes their real motive, he returns to the RV and sees their methamphetamine lab. He correctly identifies Walter as "Heisenberg", who is known for producing high-quality blue meth. He agrees to take Walter and Jesse on as clients. Mike Ehrmantraut visits Saul and provides him with information about Walter, including the fact that he has cancer. Mike advises Saul against working with Walter, calling him an amateur, but Saul is impressed by the quality of his meth. Saul arrives at the school where Walter works to convince him to let Saul be his full-time counsel.

On November 12, 2010, Francesca Liddy drives to a pay phone in a remote location and awaits a call from Jimmy, now living as Gene Takavic in Omaha. Francesca answers and updates Gene on events that have happened since he left Albuquerque. She tells Gene that the police seized all his assets and that she received a call from his ex-wife Kim Wexler, who asked about his safety. Gene is taken aback, and later calls Kim's workplace in Florida. However, the conversation turns argumentative, and an enraged Gene hangs up.

Gene convinces Jeff and Buddy to help him with another scam in which Gene targets rich single men at bars and buys them drinks. Jeff then picks them up in his taxi and offers them bottles of water laced with barbiturates. Once the target is home and unconscious, Buddy enters and photographs his personal and financial information, including credit cards, driver's licenses, and tax documents, which the group sells for use in identity theft schemes. One night, Gene targets Mr. Lingk, a man who has cancer. Despite feeling guilty, Gene continues with the usual plan. Buddy expresses misgivings; unknown to the group, Marion witnesses Gene angrily escorting Buddy into her garage as he unsuccessfully tries to persuade Buddy to do his part. Gene fires Buddy, enlists a reluctant Jeff to help him finish stealing Lingk's information, and breaks into Lingk's house himself.

Production 

The episode shares its title with Breaking Bad, the show that precedes Better Call Saul – mirroring the Breaking Bad episode which introduced Saul being named "Better Call Saul". "Breaking Bad" was written and directed by Thomas Schnauz, who had been with the writing staff since the third season of Breaking Bad. Schnauz wanted to extend the phone call scene with Jimmy and Francesca, and chose to include Jimmy contacting Kim. However, he did not want to reveal the dialogue of Jimmy's call with Kim until later, as he felt that it was "better to get right to the emotion of what happened during that phone call and how that emotion spiraled him into what happens in the rest of the episode" due to the length of the scene. He decided to include Walter White and Jesse Pinkman in the episode as he felt "[it came down to] highlighting the emotions that were going on then and now, as far as Saul needing to up his game and go even further and get something that's his own, which he thinks is Walter White". He further described Gene as a "whole other creature entirely. He's not quite Saul, he's not Jimmy" as he did not process his trauma in a healthy manner and instead "keeps pushing down and pushing down and pushing down, and the more he pushes it down, the more it wants to rise up like a volcano, and he needs to do even worse stuff." He also noted the parallel between Saul accepting Walter and Jesse as clients, and Gene performing scams with Jeff and Buddy, as he is dealing with Wexler's separation. He included The Monkees song "Tapioca Tundra" (1968), as he felt a lyric from that song symbolized McGill's identity crisis. D. W. Griffith's film Intolerance (1916) inspired how the different timelines were depicted and intercut.

Bob Odenkirk and Jonathan Banks, who play Jimmy McGill and Mike Ehrmantraut, are the only cast members listed in the starring credits. The audio team reused an audio snippet from the original Breaking Bad "Better Call Saul" episode where Goodman was gagged and altered it to convey it from his point of view. Cinematographer Marshall Adams sought to replicate Michael Slovis' work on Breaking Bad, and attempted to replicate his lighting and coloring. "Breaking Bad" features the return of Bryan Cranston and Aaron Paul as Walter White and Jesse Pinkman, the main characters of Breaking Bad. Their scene in "Breaking Bad" was the first of three scenes that they shot for Better Call Saul. It was filmed in April 2021, during the production of the sixth season's second episode, to accommodate their schedules. Though both RV vehicles used during filming of Breaking Bad were still available, the one normally used for interior shots had been gutted, so the interior of the RV was recreated on a set. Set designer Ashley Marsh and her team worked from photos and stills from Breaking Bad to reacquire most of the equipment shown in the RV to detail, and even worked with the operator of an Albuquerque Breaking Bad tour to provide some of the RV curtains and fabrics. Schnauz wrote their scene before finishing the rest of the episode's script. Filming for the scene took a day and a half. Cranston and Paul's appearances were treated with high secrecy, with both actors kept out of sight while in Albuquerque, similar to Cranston's cameo in El Camino: A Breaking Bad Movie (2019). They stayed in Albuquerque for four days at an Airbnb, with all wardrobe and makeup done in the home and only leaving to be taken on site to shoot. The scenes set in Omaha are entirely in black and white.

Reception

Critical response 

On the review aggregator Rotten Tomatoes, 100% of nine reviews are positive, with an average rating of 8.4/10.

Ratings 
An estimated 1.34 million viewers watched "Breaking Bad" during its first broadcast on AMC on August 1, 2022.

Notes

References

External links 
 "Breaking Bad" at AMC
 

2022 American television episodes
Better Call Saul (season 6) episodes
Black-and-white television episodes
Identity theft in popular culture